Heidy Bohlen (born 6 September 1945) is a German film actress.

Filmography

References

External links
 

1945 births
Living people
German film actresses
20th-century German actresses
Place of birth missing (living people)